Ivanenko is a Ukrainian surname. It may refer to:

 Dmitri Ivanenko (1904–1994), Soviet physicist
 Oksana Ivanenko (1906–1997), Ukrainian children's writer and translator
 Viktor Ivanenko (born 1961), Ukrainian sport shooter
 Volodymyr Ivanenko (1954–2006), Ukrainian television producer
 Vyacheslav Ivanenko (born 1961), Soviet race walker
 Yevgeniy Ivanenko (born 1995), Belarusian footballer

See also
 

Ukrainian-language surnames
Patronymic surnames
Surnames from given names